Marol is a village situated near the confluence of the Suru River and the Indus River in the Kharmang District of Baltistan, Pakistan.  It is close to the India–Pakistan border (LOC).

Geography 
It is closer to the LOC along the Indus River valley.

The main trade route between Baltistan and Ladakh used to pass through Marol, via the Suru River valley and Kargil town. It would then traverse the Wakha Rong valley, cross Namika La and Fotu La passes to rejoin the Indus Valley at Khalatse.  (This is the route followed by modern National Highway 1 of India between Kargil and Leh at the present time.) The Indus gorge between Marol and Dha was avoided due to the difficulty of navigating  the narrow gorge. But some trade did pass through this route, probably conducted by the Brokpa themselves, and taxes were collected by Baltistan at Ganokh.

History 
In the seventeenth century Jamyang Namgyal of Ladakh had a conflict with Ali Sher Khan Anchan of Skardu and had to accept Gurgurdo near Batalik as the boundary between Ladakh and Baltistan. During Zorawar Singh's invasion of Baltistan in 1840, Balti defences are said to have been set up on the plateau to the north of Marol. The defences did not deter Zorawar Singh, but the Baltis' destruction of the Marol Bridge did cause them considerable problems down the line. The Raja of Kharmang, Sher Ali Khan, submitted to Zorawar Singh and provided cooperation. After the conquest of Baltistan, Kharmang was retained as a jagir of the Raja, and Marol as well as Ganokh were left under his jurisdiction.

Demographics 
During the British Raj period, the village was said to have been inhabited by Balti as well as Brokpa people. However it is unclear if there are any Brokskat speakers in the village at the present time.

Maps

See also 
 Aryan Valley
 Olthingthang

References

Bibliography 
 
 

Populated places in Kharmang District
Populated places in Gilgit-Baltistan